Charles Hubby "Hub" Shoemake (September 29, 1899 – March 10, 1984) was an American football player who played one season for the Decatur Staleys of the National Football League (NFL).  He played college football at three colleges, Lake Forest College, University of Illinois, and Bethany College.

External links
Hub Shoemake Bio (Staley Museum)

References

1899 births
1984 deaths
People from Oskaloosa, Iowa
Players of American football from Iowa
American football guards
Lake Forest Foresters football players
Illinois Fighting Illini football players
Bethany Bison football players